This article contains a list of current SNCF railway stations in the Île-de-France region of France (RER stations with no other SNCF service are not included in this list; see the separate list of RER stations).

Essonne (91)

 Angerville

Hauts-de-Seine (92)

 Asnières-sur-Seine
 
 
 
 
 
 
 
 
 
 
 
 
 
 
 
 
 
 
 
 
 Le Val-d'Or
 Les Vallées

Paris (75)

 Gare d'Austerlitz
 Gare de Bercy
 Gare de l'Est
 Gare de Lyon
 Gare Montparnasse
 Gare du Nord
 Gare Saint-Lazare
 Pont Cardinet

Seine-et-Marne (77)

 
 
 
 
 
 
 
 
 
 
 
 
 
 
 
 
 
 
 Fontainebleau-Forêt

Seine-Saint-Denis (93)

 Aéroport Charles de Gaulle 2 TGV

Val-d'Oise (95)

 Argenteuil
 Auvers-sur-Oise
 
 
 
 
 
 
 
 
 
 
 
 
 
 
 
 
 
 Écouen - Ézanville
 Enghien-les-Bains
 Épluches
 Éragny-Neuville
 Ermont–Eaubonne
 Ermont-Halte
 
 
 
 
 
 Herblay

Yvelines (78)

 Achères-Ville
 Andrésy
 
 
 
 
 
 
 
 Les Clairières-de-Verneuil
 
 
 
 Épône-Mézières
 Les Essarts-le-Roi
 
 
 
 
 
 
 
 
 
 
 
 
 
 
 
 
 
 
 
 
 
 Les Mureaux
 
 Orgerus-Béhoust
 Le Perray

See also
 SNCF
 List of SNCF stations for SNCF stations in other regions
 List of Transilien stations

Ile
Railway stations in Île-de-France